Henni Malinen (born 17 November 1988) is a Finnish footballer who currently plays for FC Honka in the Kansallinen Liiga.

International career

Malinen was part of the Finnish team at the 2013 European Championships.

References

1988 births
FC Honka (women) players
NiceFutis players
Kansallinen Liiga players
Finnish women's footballers
Women's association football forwards
Finland women's international footballers
Living people